Altoona is an unincorporated community and census-designated place (CDP) in Lake County, Florida, United States. The population was 89 at the 2010 census. It is part of the Orlando–Kissimmee–Sanford Metropolitan Statistical Area.

Geography
Altoona is located in northeastern Lake County at  (28.965742, -81.648453). To the north, SR 19 enters the Ocala National Forest and leads  to Palatka.

History
Altoona was either named after Thomas Jefferson Hinson's hometown of Allatoona, Georgia, or after Altoona, Pennsylvania, which was the hometown of Augustus Gottschee, the first merchant in this settlement. Altoona became an incorporated municipality on February 12, 1887. The town was abolished on May 27, 1899, following a fire that wiped out most of its buildings and reduced its tax base to near zero.

Demographics

As of the census of 2000, there were 88 people, 39 households, and 26 families residing in the CDP. The racial makeup of the CDP was 98.86% White, 1.14% from other races. Hispanic or Latino of any race were 1.14% of the population.

There were 39 households, out of which 20.5% had children under the age of 18 living with them, 61.5% were married couples living together, 5.1% had a female householder with no husband present, and 30.8% were non-families. 28.2% of all households were made up of individuals, and 2.6% had someone living alone who was 65 years of age or older. The average household size was 2.26 and the average family size was 2.78.

In the CDP, the population was spread out, with 19.3% under the age of 18, 8.0% from 18 to 24, 33.0% from 25 to 44, 26.1% from 45 to 64, and 13.6% who were 65 years of age or older. The median age was 40 years. For every 100 females, there were 91.3 males. For every 100 females age 18 and over, there were 102.9 males.

The median income for a household in the CDP was $27,143, and the median income for a family was $58,750. Males had a median income of $22,000 versus $40,417 for females. The per capita income for the CDP was $16,939.  None of the population and none of the families were below the poverty line.

References

Census-designated places in Lake County, Florida
Greater Orlando
Census-designated places in Florida
Former municipalities in Florida